The Chung Shan Industrial and Commercial School (CSIC) is a vocational school in Daliao District, Kaohsiung, Taiwan. Furthermore, the school also famous for football and volleyball in Taiwan.

See also
Vocational school

External links
Chung Shan Industrial and Commercial School

Schools in Kaohsiung
High schools in Taiwan
Educational institutions established in 1957
1957 establishments in Taiwan